Francesco Nucara (3 April 1940 – 12 May 2022) was an Italian politician.

Biography
Francesco Nucara was born in Reggio Calabria, and graduated in statistics and actuarial science and architecture.

He was elected in the Chamber of Deputies for the first time in the 1983 general election, into the list of the Republican Party. 
In 1989 he was appointed Undersecretary of State for Public Works in the Andreotti VI Cabinet.

In 2001 he was appointed National Secretary of the PRI. Under his leadership the PRI has strengthened the alliance with the House of Freedom led by Silvio Berlusconi. In the same year he was appointed Deputy Minister of Environment in the Berlusconi II Cabinet.

In the 2006 general election he was elected at the Chamber of Deputies with Forza Italia and in the 2008 general election he was re-elected with The People of Freedom.

References

1940 births
2022 deaths
People from Reggio Calabria
Italian Republican Party politicians
Deputies of Legislature IX of Italy
Deputies of Legislature X of Italy
Deputies of Legislature XI of Italy
Deputies of Legislature XV of Italy
Deputies of Legislature XVI of Italy
Politicians of Calabria